A voiceless uvular implosive is a rare consonantal sound, used in some spoken languages. A dedicated IPA letter, was withdrawn in 1993.

Features

Occurrence
A voiceless uvular implosive has been claimed for several Mayan languages.

See also
 List of phonetics topics
 Voiced uvular implosive

References

External links
 

Uvular consonants
Implosives
Voiceless oral consonants
Central consonants